The Adrenaline Project is a Canadian extreme sports reality TV show. Season one premiered September 29, 2007 on YTV's Get Real! at 7:00 p.m. ET, & on FOX's 4Kids TV at 8:00 a.m. ET. The first season was hosted by former MuchMoreMusic VJ Richard "Caz" Cazeau, and also featured Boomer Phillips.

Season two was hosted exclusively by Boomer and the 26 episode season premiered September 6, 2008 6:00pm ET on YTV. This season was not seen in the US, as 4Kids TV cancelled the series on April 5, 2008, and was not moved to its successor block, The CW4Kids.

Format
In season 1 each week, The Adrenaline Project takes five teens to Boomer's base camp, in which they complete in two physical and mental challenges. One contestant is eliminated in each of the base camp challenges. The three remaining contestants go to Caz's final challenge and compete to win the competition and associated prizes.

In season 2, six teens compete each week in a tournament that spans half of the season. In each of the two semifinals, five winners and one wild card compete in a series of three rounds in the same format. The two semifinal winners move on to the final to compete in a series of three challenges to determine the Ultimate Adrenalite. The second half of the season has 60 new competitors competing in the same tournament format. In addition, winners of this season would win a trip to Walt Disney World. The Adrenaline Project is a Marblemedia production, and created by Mark Bishop and Matt Hornburg. Despite the fact that the show is a Canadian production, the version airing on YTV is not entirely the same as the version airing on 4Kids TV. During the episode in the American broadcasts, trivia will appear either horizontally or vertically displaying factoids relating to that particular event. This does not appear in the version airing on YTV. The program formerly aired on the Latin American version of Boomerang.

Cast

Caz 
Caz is the co-host of The Adrenaline Project Season 1. Each week, Caz joins the three contestants that make it past Boomer's basic training, and travels with them to the destination for that week's final challenge. While the contestants do not know what they are in for until the last moment, Caz guides them through the final challenge. Caz does not appear in Season 2.

Boomer 
Boomer does the basic training for the five contestants and during the two rounds, the last place player is eliminated. In Season 2, Boomer is the sole host. He does basic training with the six contestants and hosts each of the three challenges.

Episodes

Season 1: 2007–2008 

Episode 1 – Cliff Hanger – September 29, 2007
 	

Episode 2 – Under Pressure – October 13, 2007
 	
        
Episode 3 – Draw the Line (also known as Zipline) – October 20, 2007
 	
        
Episode 4 – A Rock and a Hard Place – October 27, 2007
 	

Episode 5 – Up The Creek – November 10, 2007
 	

Episode 6 – Sea What I Mean? – November 17, 2007
 	

Episode 7 – Leap of Faith – November 24, 2007
 	

Episode 8 – Trail Blazer – December 1, 2007
 	

Episode 9 – Mush – December 8, 2007
 	

Episode 10 – Water Walker – December 15, 2007
 	

Episode 11 – Don't Cross Me – January 19, 2008
 	

Episode 12 – In Thin Air – January 26, 2008
 	

Episode 13 – I Can Dig It – February 2, 2008

Season 2: 2008–2009
Season 2 did not air on 4Kids TV, but only on YTV.

First Tournament

Episode 14 – Houdini – September 20, 2008
Winner and semifinalist – Paige Haight

Episode 15 – Bridge It – September 27, 2008
Winner and semifinalist – Andrew Brownlee

Episode 16 – Special: Air Cadets – October 4, 2008
Winner and semifinalist – Dylan Stephans

Episode 17 – Drop the Rope – October 11, 2008
Winner and semifinalist – Tucker McNee

Episode 18 – Special: Beauty Queens – October 18, 2008
Winner and semifinalist – Selina Mendez

Episode 19 – Keys to Your Future – October 25, 2008
Winner and semifinalist – Josh Evans

Episode 20 – X-Sports – November 1, 2008
Winner and semifinalist – Kasper Sherk

Episode 21 – Twins – November 8, 2008
Winner and semifinalist – Zachary Moore

Episode 22 – Breaking Away – November 15, 2008
Winner and semifinalist – Logan Cordiner

Episode 23 – Special: Karate Kids – November 15, 2008
Winner and semifinalist – Jamal Muckett

Episode 24 – Semi-Finals #1 – November 22, 2008
Winner and finalist – Andrew Brownlee

Wildcard; chosen by Boomer directly.

Episode 25 – Semi-Finals #2 – November 22, 2008
Winner and finalist – Kasper Sherk

Wildcard; chosen by Boomer directly.

Episode 26 – The Ultimate Adrenalite – November 29, 2008
Winner and Ultimate Adrenalite – Andrew Brownlee

Second Tournament
Episode 27 – Up, Up and Away – January 27, 2009
Winner and semifinalist – Rachel Gooz

 	

Episode 28 – Cannon Ball – February 3, 2009
Winner and semifinalist – Scott Goddard

 	

Episode 29 – All in the Family – February 10, 2009
Winner and semifinalist – Mitch Morris

 	
 Episode 30 – Locked, Loaded, and Loose – June 17, 2009
Winner and semifinalist – Sarah Clark
		
 Episode 31 – Around the Horn – June 24, 2009
Winner and semifinalist – Nano Clow

 Episode 32 – Human Pendulum – July 3, 2009
Winner and semifinalist – Dimytry Smiths
        
       

 Episode 33 – Special: Cheerleaders – July 10, 2009
Winner and semifinalist – Kiki Cordado
       

 Episode 34 – Special: Models – July 17, 2009
Winner and semifinalist – Jordan Murrell
        
       
Jessica withdrew because of a leg injury and had to be sent to the hospital. She didn't compete in the elimination challenge.

 Episode 35 – Battleball Regatta – July 24, 2009

Winner and semifinalist – Mark Gaudet

 Episode 36 – Special: Scouts – July 31, 2009

Winner and semifinalist – Stephanie Forsyth

 Episode 37 – Semi-Finals #1 – August 7, 2009
Winner and finalist – Dimytry Smiths

	
Wildcard; chosen by Boomer directly.

 Episode 38 – Semi-Finals #2 – August 14, 2009
Winner and finalist – Nano Clow

Wildcard; chosen by Boomer directly.

 Episode 39 – The Ultimate Adrenalite – August 21, 2009
Winner and Ultimate Adrenalite- Nano Clow

Music 
Main Theme Song:
Glory – These Silhouettes

Note: This song was not recorded by the band These Silhouettes entirely. This was sung by Stuart Aiken from the band, but was also written by Jesse Colborne and Aaron Verdonk (of stereos).

Awards 

The Adrenaline Project has been nominated for a Gemini Award for Best Children's or Youth Non-Fiction Program or Series.

References

External links 
 
 Official trailer
 MySpace Page

2007 Canadian television series debuts
2009 Canadian television series endings
2000s Canadian reality television series
2000s Canadian children's television series
Canadian children's reality television series
YTV (Canadian TV channel) original programming
Fox Broadcasting Company original programming
Television series about teenagers
Television series by DHX Media